Hernán Videla Lira (born 19 May 1903–22 September 1982) was a Chilean politician and entrepreneur who served as President of the Senate of Chile.

External links
 BCN Profile

1903 births
1982 deaths
Chilean people
Chilean politicians
Liberal Party (Chile, 1849) politicians
Presidents of the Senate of Chile